Vanishing Point is a progressive metal band based in Melbourne, Australia founded in the early 1990's with Silvio Massaro as the longest serving member.

Discography

External links 
 
Vanishing Point at MySpace
AFM Records
Never Walk Away Video Clip

Musical groups established in 1995
Victoria (Australia) musical groups
Australian progressive metal musical groups